Vendôme station is an intermodal transit station in the borough of Côte-des-Neiges–Notre-Dame-de-Grâce in Montreal, Quebec, Canada, near the town of Westmount in the Westmount Adjacent area of Notre-Dame-de-Grâce that adjoins the Décarie Expressway. It is operated by the Société de transport de Montréal (STM) and serves the Orange Line of the Montreal Metro.

The station connects to Exo's commuter rail network by a pedestrian tunnel, permitting access to platforms providing service on the Vaudreuil-Hudson, Saint-Jérôme and Candiac lines.

Overview 
Originally, two stations were supposed to be built between Place-Saint-Henri and Villa-Maria: Northcliffe and Westmount. However, opposition from Westmount residents as well as instability in the underlying rock formation forced their consolidation into one station, with the result that the tunnel between Vendôme and Place-Saint-Henri is the longest on the Island of Montreal.

The station is a normal side platform station with an entrance near the midpoint of the platforms. The main entrance is located on De Maisonneuve Boulevard and another entrance is located in the bus loop. The structure sits directly above the platforms and includes and surrounds the sunken mezzanine. It is the network's deepest station without escalators or moving sidewalks.

The station was designed by the firm of Desnoyers, Mercure, Leziy, Gagnon, Sheppard et Gélinas. It contains a plaque commemorating Jean Descaris, a 17th-century pioneer, and his descendant Alphonse Décarie, on whose land Vendôme and Villa-Maria Metro stations were built. The adjacent train station is in Fare Zone 1.

Accessibility and MUHC Hospital connection 
A short tunnel under the railway tracks links this Metro station to the McGill University Health Centre, which opened in 2015. Initially, the tunnel provided access only to a secondary entrance building on the hospital campus, with a door between the tunnel and the underground parking garage kept locked; however, the access to the underground parking was later opened to the public and pedestrian paths through the garage provided, offering indoor access from the metro to the hospital. Although the secondary entrance building has an elevator, the new tunnel was not wheelchair accessible, with only stair access to the metro and commuter trains. This lack of provision was criticised by advocates.

In fall 2017, construction began on another entrance to the station, located east of the bus loop. This was designed to offer a wheelchair-accessible direct connection between the metro station, the commuter train platforms, and the hospital via a pedestrian tunnel. The choice to construct a second access was made because retrofitting the existing access was deemed prohibitively expensive. The new entrance pavilion also includes new public art. The new entrance was opened on May 31, 2021, making the station fully accessible.

Artwork 
The station features two artworks. The first artwork is by Quebec artist Marcelle Ferron, and consists of a stained-glass window and a stainless steel sculpture over the tracks. It was installed when the station first opened. The second artwork was installed as part of the work to make the station accessible in the mid 2010s. It comprises a set of three ceramic mosaics, by artist Patrick Bernatchez. It is located in the east entrance of the station.

Origin of the name

This station is named for avenue de Vendôme, in turn possibly named for the French Dukes of Vendôme.

Exo station

Vendôme station is a commuter rail station operated by Exo in Montreal, Quebec, Canada. It is located in the Notre-Dame-de-Grâce area of the Côte-des-Neiges–Notre-Dame-de-Grâce borough, and is served by the Vaudreuil-Hudson, Saint-Jérôme and Candiac Lines. The station is connected by a pedestrian tunnel to the Montreal Metro's Vendôme station.

The station originally had two tracks (and two side platforms), but in 2015, a third track running between Montreal West and Downtown Montreal's Lucien-L'Allier station was added for improved service, and platform 2 was rebuilt as a wider island platform so trains running on the new track could call at the station as well.

The station is in the ARTM's Fare Zone A. Prior to the reform of the ARTM's fare system in July 2022, it was in zone 1.

Connecting bus routes

Nearby points of interest
 Complexe de santé Reine-Élisabeth
 Shadd Academy
 Centre Saint-Raymond
 Georges-Saint-Pierre Park
 McGill University Health Centre (MUHC)
 Shriners Hospital for Children – Canada
 Unitarian Church of Montréal
 Victoria Village, Westmount

References

External links

 Vendôme Station, official web page
 Vendôme metro station geo location
 Photos of Vendôme station architectural features at Desnoyers Mercure & associates, architects (French page)
 Montreal by Metro, metrodemontreal.com – photos, information, and trivia
 2011 STM System Map
 Metro Map
RTM page for Vendôme

Orange Line (Montreal Metro)
Railway stations in Canada opened in 1981
Côte-des-Neiges–Notre-Dame-de-Grâce
Exo commuter rail stations
Railway stations in Montreal
1981 establishments in Quebec